The Harold B. Lee Library (HBLL) is the main academic library of Brigham Young University (BYU) located in Provo, Utah. The library started as a small collection of books in the president's office in 1876 before moving in 1891. The Heber J. Grant Library building was completed in 1925, and in 1961 the library moved to the newly constructed J. Reuben Clark Library where it stands today. That building was renamed to the Harold B. Lee Library in 1974.

The library was significantly expanded in the 1990s, providing new individual and group study rooms and a special vault area for the L. Tom Perry Special Collections Library. In 2016, the library contained over 4.7 million books, 10.6 million total materials, and served over 10,000 patrons each day. The library was ranked by the Princeton Review within the top three university libraries in the United States three times: in 2004, 2007, and 2012.

History
 
A collection of books in Karl G. Maeser’s office served as the first library at Brigham Young Academy. In 1891, the library moved to a room in the Education Building in the lower campus, which expanded to include Room D about 1906. George Q. Cannon and Reed Smoot helped to acquire documents from the U.S. Department of the Interior and congressional documents. A fire in 1884 destroyed at least forty volumes of the collection. Students rarely checked out books in the early 1900s, generally studying books in the library instead. The Dewey Decimal Classification system was introduced to the library in 1908.

English professor Alice Louise Reynolds helped raise funds to purchase over 1,000 books for the library. She was the faculty chair of a committee to establish the library from 1906 to 1925. The library contained 29,592 volumes by 1923—almost half of them donated—and students had to stand in the library for lack of study space Reynolds' fan club donated over 10,000 volumes in the 1930s. By 1946, the library contained 138,500 volumes of books.

The Heber J. Grant Library was completed in 1925. In the Grant Library, reference books were placed on shelves surrounding the study area, with the rest of the library's holdings on shelves in the book room. Students would find books they wanted in the catalog, and library pages would retrieve them.

The library increased the volume of acquisitions during the 1930s and 1940s, and gifts of books were indiscriminately accepted. This policy changed in 1958, when gifts became subject to a consultation with the Director of Libraries, S. Lyman Tyler. In his time as director from 1954 to 1966, Tyler met Keyes Metcalf at a seminar for library administrators. Metcalf was the former director of the Harvard Library, and consulted with Tyler about the plans for BYU's new library. BYU commissioned Lorenzo Snow Young to make the plans for addition.

The J. Reuben Clark Library was completed in 1961. The library's collection reached 500,000 volumes in 1965, and one million volumes by 1971. The name of library changed in 1974 from the J. Reuben Clark Library to the Harold B. Lee Library to avoid confusion with the J. Reuben Clark Law School. Harold B. Lee was the 11th president of the Church of Jesus Christ of Latter-day Saints.

A six-story addition was completed in 1976, doubling the library's physical space and increasing the library's seating capacity from 2,500 to 4,500. The addition had moveable walls, integrated student study spaces into the stacks, added group study rooms, and included a vault for archival materials. Art professor and artist Franz M. Johansen created four cast stone panels used to decorate the south entrance of the library and representing four areas of human knowledge.

The HBLL was again expanded and remodeled in the mid– and late–1990s using donated funds, adding , technology classrooms, an auditorium, and a digitization center. After the expansion, parts of the old library were remodeled, and the south entrance was closed. A new south entrance was opened in 2015.

From 2001 to 2011, the Interlibrary Loan program processed 500,000 requests. The library contained over 4.7 million books and served an average of 10,191 patrons a day during 2016. Single-user study rooms were added in 2017, and construction started on a family-friendly study room.

Technological improvements
The HBLL started offering a dial-up access system in 1969 for patrons to access music, lectures, and foreign language recordings, and access to the Library Information Network Center (LINC) was offered in 1974. Through a keyword search, patrons could use the system to search bibliographic resources of articles and recent books from ProQuest Dialog and Orbit II. The library adopted 3M Tattle-Tape in 1975 to detect if patrons were removing books from the library that had not been checked out. The library renamed their NOTIS cataloging system in 1984 to the Brigham Young University Information Network (BYLINE), and ran it on a mainframe computer located in the James E. Talmage Building.

The library collection began being re-catalogued in 1995 from the Dewey Decimal Classification system to a modified Library of Congress Classification. A word processing center in the library made 25 computers available to students at the rate of $1 per hour in 1996. In 1997, the library switched from using the DOS-based BYLINE to the Windows-based Horizon Automated Library Systems. The Horizon system allowed users to access online catalogs from other libraries, and used a client-server model.

The library contained 200 computers but only a portion of them had internet access in 1997. The library launched an online library catalog in 1998 after integrating the search system, providing online renewals and extending undergraduate checkout times. An electronic reserve system with an additional server was added in 1999. The library added wireless internet access points to its study spaces in 2003.

Library instruction

The HBLL instituted a summer program to certify students as school librarians in 1938, later offering the program during the school year. A class on bookbinding was taught during the 1940s. The BYU School of Library and Information Science was established in 1966 and re-accredited in 1978. It had about 50 graduates a year. Prior to this program, Mary Elizabeth Downey taught a six-week class on the use of libraries. The School of Library and Information Science was closed in 1993, despite the program being in high demand. The closure occurred after the administration announced a renewed focus on undergraduate studies.

Collections

The HBLL includes a family history library, the Primrose International Viola Archive, the International Harp Archives, and serves as a designated depository of government documents. The juvenile literature department opened its Lloyd Alexander Collection in January 2010, featuring items  from the author's home office for students and researchers to access.

Special collections
The library's special collections began in 1957 with 1000 books and 50 manuscript collections. A special vault and cold storage facility were built in 2000 and the collection was formally named the L. Tom Perry Special Collections Library. The collection at the time contained over 8000 manuscript collections, 500,000 photographs, and 280,000 books. Notable items from the collection include a 1967 Bible illustrated by Salvador Dalí, a 13th-century Vulgate, a first edition Book of Mormon, and the papers of Cecil B. DeMille and Helen Foster Snow.

Foreign language collections
The HBLL houses collections in many foreign languages. The collection includes a Welsh library originally sponsored in 1951 by the National Gymanfa Association of the United States and Canada. The Icelandic Library Association of Spanish Fork donated their collection of Icelandic books in 1951.

Religious influence on collections
Starting in 2004, R-rated movies were placed in the Faculty Use collection. The Romance section includes a guide with ratings for the amount of sexual content in the books, and novels with explicit sexual material are not included in the collection.

Awards and recognition
In 2004, the Princeton Review ranked the HBLL as the number one college library, and as number three in 2007 and 2012. The American Library Association awarded the HBLL with the Library Instruction Round Table 2017 Innovation in Instruction Award.

See also
Education in Zion Gallery

References

External links

Scholars Archive, an open repository for BYU theses, dissertations, and journals
Backstage documentary about HBLL

University and college academic libraries in the United States
BYU Library
Libraries in Utah
Library, Harold B. Lee
Libraries established in 1925
Library buildings completed in 1961
Library buildings completed in 1976
Library buildings completed in 2000
Brigham Young University buildings
1961 establishments in Utah
Harold B. Lee Library-related articles